Veronika Kudermetova and Elise Mertens defeated the defending champions Barbora Krejčíková and Kateřina Siniaková in the final, 6–2, 4–6, [11–9] to win the doubles tennis title at the 2022 WTA Finals.

Siniaková, Coco Gauff and Kudermetova were in contention for the year-end individual No. 1 doubles ranking at the beginning of the tournament. Siniaková clinched the year-end top spot by virtue of winning two round robin matches.

Seeds

Alternates

Draw

Finals

Group Rosie Casals

Group Pam Shriver 

Standings are determined by: 1. number of wins; 2. number of matches; 3. in two-team ties, head-to-head records; 4. in three-team ties, (a) percentage of sets won (head-to-head records if two teams remain tied), then (b) percentage of games won (head-to-head records if two teams remain tied), then (c) WTA rankings.

References

External links 
 Main draw
 Official website
 WTA website draw

Finals
2022 doubles